John Dobie (1859–1892) was a Church of Scotland minister skilled in Hebrew and closely associated with India. A polyglot he could speak English, French, German, Persian, Hebrew, Hindustani and Arabic. His career was cut short when he was killed in a railway accident.

Life 

He was born in Musselburgh on 10 January 1859 the son of William Dobie, minister of Ladykirk. John studied at Edinburgh University graduating MA in 1878 then doing further studies in Divinity graduating BD in 1882. He was licensed to preach as a Church of Scotland minister by the Presbytery of Chirnside.

His first role was as assistant at Park Church, Glasgow. He became Secretary to the Committee on Christian Life and Work. He then took a year off to do "oriental research" in Paris and Leipzig (this appears to have focussed upon India).

In 1888 he was appointed Church of Scotland Chaplain in Secunderabad in central India. He then obtained a post at the University of Bombay as Wilson Lecturer on Comparative Philology of the Semitic Languages. In December 1892 he returned to Scotland to take up the role of Professor of Hebrew and Semitic Languages at Edinburgh University in place of Rev Prof David Laird Adams.

During a trip to Arabia he joined a caravan of Arab pilgrims travelling to Yemen seeking to investigate Himyarite remains and increase his knowledge of Yemenite Jews. This backfired when he was arrested and had to be released through the intervention of the British government.

He was killed in a train accident when a passenger train hit a freight train head-on near Newtonmore on 2 August 1894. He was aged 35. Dobie was the only fatality, but eight others were injured.

Memorials

A stained glass window was erected to his memory in Ladykirk church.

Publications
His translation of the New Testament into Ethiopic remains with Edinburgh University.

References
 

1859 births
1894 deaths
People from East Lothian
Alumni of the University of Edinburgh
Academics of the University of Edinburgh
Linguists from the United Kingdom
Railway accident deaths in Scotland